Mario Mauro (born 24 July 1961) is an Italian politician and a university teacher of history. He is the former Minister of Defense, having served in the Letta Cabinet from 2013 to 2014. From 1999 to 2013, he was a member of the European Parliament, and he is a member of the Italian movement Communion and Liberation.

Early life and education
Mauro was born in San Giovanni Rotondo on 24 July 1961. He studied literature and philosophy at the Università Cattolica del Sacro Cuore (UCSC) in Milan and received a degree in 1985.

Career
Mauro began his career as teacher in southern Italy after graduation and until 1999, he continued to serve as a teacher and established the Public Social Services University Research Centre. He was first elected to the European Parliament in 1999 with the PPE-DE group. From 1999 to 2004, he was vice president of the education and culture commission. On 2 July 2004, he was elected one of the 14 vice presidents of the parliament. His tenure as vice president lasted until 2009. In June 2009, he was elected again to the parliament. He assumed the post of the leader of the Italian center-right MEPs for the period of 2009–2013.

In addition to his position as European Parliamentary, he held the following positions: representative of the Organization for Security and Cooperation in Europe (OSCE) against racism, xenophobia, and discrimination, concerning discrimination against Christians from 2009 to 2011, and adjunct professor at the European University of Rome from 2007 to 2009.

In 2013, Mauro resigned from Il Popolo della Libertà and joined Civic Choice (SC). He was elected senator on With Monti for Italy's lists, a coalition between Civic Choice, Union of the Centre and Future and Freedom. He was elected the leader of the SC parliamentary group in the Senate. He was replaced in the European Parliament by Susy De Martini.

On 28 April 2013, Mauro was sworn in as defense minister in the grand coalition cabinet of Enrico Letta. After internal rifts inside the Civic Choice party, Mauro left it in November 2013 and launched the new Populars for Italy.

Personal life
Mauro is married to Giovanna; they have two children, Francesca Romana and Angelo.

See also
Popolari per l'Italia
Communion and Liberation

References

External links

|-

|-

1961 births
Living people
People from San Giovanni Rotondo
The People of Freedom politicians
Civic Choice politicians
Populars for Italy politicians
Italian Ministers of Defence
Senators of Legislature XVII of Italy
Politicians of Apulia
Letta Cabinet
Forza Italia MEPs
The People of Freedom MEPs
MEPs for Italy 1999–2004
MEPs for Italy 2004–2009
MEPs for Italy 2009–2014
Italian academics